Ronald Reed Saul (February 5, 1948 – June 16, 2021) was an American professional football player who was an offensive lineman in the National Football League (NFL) for the Houston Oilers and the Washington Redskins. He played college football at Michigan State University and was drafted in the fifth round of the 1970 NFL Draft.

Ron had two brothers that also played in the NFL; his older brother Bill Saul, and his twin brother Rich Saul, who also played for Michigan State.

References

1948 births
2021 deaths
People from Butler, Pennsylvania
American football offensive linemen
Michigan State Spartans football players
Houston Oilers players
Washington Redskins players
Twin sportspeople
American twins
Players of American football from Pennsylvania